Battle of Kerj Abu Dulaf was fought in 1073 between the Seljuk Army of Malik-Shah I and Kerman Seljuk army of Qavurt and his son, Sultan-shah. It took place approximately near Kerj Abu Dulaf, the present-day between Hamadan and Arak, and was a decisive Malik-Shah I victory.

After death Alp-Arslan, Malik-Shah was declared as the new sultan of the empire. However, right after Malik-Shah accession, his uncle Qavurt claimed the throne for himself and sent Malik-Shah a message which said: "I am the eldest brother, and you are a youthful son; I have the greater right to my brother Alp-Arslan's inheritance." Malik-Shah then replied by sending the following message: "A brother does not inherit when there is a son.". This message enraged Qavurt, who thereafter occupied Isfahan. In 1073 a battle took place near Hamadan, which lasted three days. Qavurt was accompanied by his seven sons, and his army consisted of Turkmens, while the army of Malik-Shah consisted of ghulams ("military slaves") and contingents of Kurdish and Arab troops.

During the battle, the Turks of Malik-Shah's army mutinied against him, but he nevertheless managed to defeat and capture Qavurt. Qavurt then begged for mercy and in return promised to retire to Oman. However, Nizam al-Mulk declined the offer, claiming that sparing him was an indication of weakness. After some time, Qavurt was strangled to death with a bowstring, while two of his sons were blinded. After having dealt with that problem, Malik-Shah appointed Qutlugh-Tegin as the governor of Fars and Sav-Tegin as the governor of Kerman.

References

Sources 
 Wikipedia contributors. (2019, August 5). Kerman Seljuk Sultanate. In Wikipedia, The Free Encyclopedia. Retrieved 12:48, September 13, 2019, from https://fa.wikipedia.org/wiki/سلجوقیان_کرمان
 
 

Kerj Abu Dulaf
Kerj Abu Dulaf
1073 in Asia
Wars of succession involving the states and peoples of Asia